Eskilstunahus County, or Eskilstunahus län, was a county of the Swedish Empire from 1634 to 1683, named after the county seat of Eskilstuna House. It was one of three counties in the province of Södermanland, and in 1683 they were merged into the Södermanland County.

See also
Nyköping County
Gripsholm County

Former counties of Sweden
1634 establishments in Sweden